How To Steal the World is a 1968 American action–adventure film, taken from a two-part episode of the TV series The Man from U.N.C.L.E., with Robert Vaughn and David McCallum as secret agents Napoleon Solo and Illya Kuryakin.  The film also stars Barry Sullivan, Eleanor Parker, Leslie Nielsen, Tony Bill, Peter Mark Richman, Albert Paulsen, Inger Stratton, Hugh Marlowe,  and Dan O'Herlihy. It was originally telecast as the final episode of the series, "The Seven Wonders of the World Affair". The feature version is the only U.N.C.L.E. film not to include Jerry Goldsmith's theme music. The film was directed by Sutton Roley and written by Norman Hudis.

Plot
U.N.C.L.E. agents Napoleon Solo (Robert Vaughn) and Illya Kuryakin (David McCallum) investigate when fellow agent Robert Kingsley (Barry Sullivan) and European general Maximilian Harmon (Leslie Nielsen) disappear. Shortly afterward, five of the world's top scientists are mysteriously abducted. The trail leads to the Himalayas, where Kingsley has set himself up as potential world dictator, hoping to use the combined talents of the scientists to build a device that will spread mind-controlling gas throughout the planet. However, his wife Margitta Kingsley (Eleanor Parker) has different plans for the gas.

Cast
Robert Vaughn as Napoleon Solo
David McCallum as Illya Kuryakin 
Barry Sullivan as Robert Kingsley 
Eleanor Parker as Margitta Kingsley
Leslie Nielsen as General Maximilian Harmon 
Leo G. Carroll as Alexander Waverly
Tony Bill as Steven Garrow 
Peter Mark Richman as Mr. Webb 
Albert Paulsen as Dr. Kurt Erikson 
Inger Stratton as Anna Erikson 
Hugh Marlowe as Grant 
Dan O'Herlihy as Prof. David Garrow

Release
"The Seven Wonders of the World Affair"  was originally telecast as the final two episodes of the TV series, The Man from U.N.C.L.E., which aired on NBC on January 8, 1968 and January 15, 1968. The film was released on DVD on November 2, 2011 by Warner Archive Collection.

See also

References

Sources

External links 
 
 

American spy films
1969 films
1960s spy films
Metro-Goldwyn-Mayer films
Films with screenplays by Norman Hudis
American action adventure films
Films edited from television programs
The Man from U.N.C.L.E.
Films directed by Sutton Roley
1960s English-language films
1960s American films